General Clement may refer to:

Albéric Clément (c. 1165–1191), Kingdom of France general
Charles M. Clement (1855–1934), U.S. Army National Guard major general 
Noel Clement (born 1964), Philippine Army general
William T. Clement (1894–1955), U.S. Marine Corps lieutenant general

See also
Ralph Arthur Penrhyn Clements (1855–1909), British Army major general
Scott Clements (general) (born c. 1941), Royal Canadian Air Force lieutenant general
Léon Émile Clément-Thomas (fl. 1880s–1890s), French general